The Râșca is a left tributary of the river Someșul Cald in Romania. It discharges into the Lake Tarnița, which is drained by the Someșul Cald.

References

Rivers of Romania
Rivers of Cluj County